The Copa América Centenario (literally Centennial America Cup) was an international men's association football tournament that was hosted by the United States in 2016. The competition was a celebration of the centenary of CONMEBOL and the Copa América, and was the first Copa América hosted outside South America.

The tournament was a commemorative version of Copa América (not the 45th edition). It was held as part of an agreement between CONMEBOL (the South American football confederation) and CONCACAF (the football confederation for North and Central America and the Caribbean) as a special edition between the usual three-year cycle, and featured an expanded field of sixteen teams (an increase from the usual twelve), with all ten teams from CONMEBOL and six teams from CONCACAF. Despite the tournament being an official iteration of the Copa América, the winner would not receive an invitation to the 2017 FIFA Confederations Cup due to the commemorative nature of the tournament, although eventual winners Chile had already qualified through their 2015 victory.

Chile became the fourth nation to win at least two consecutive titles in CONMEBOL tournaments, after Uruguay, Argentina and Brazil. Argentina, meanwhile, lost their third consecutive final in a major tournament, following losses to Germany at the 2014 World Cup and Chile at the 2015 Copa América.

Planning
In February 2012, Alfredo Hawit, then Acting President of CONCACAF, announced that the competition would be expected to take place in 2016, as a celebration of CONMEBOL's centenary.
CONMEBOL President Nicolás Leoz said "Hopefully we can organize a big event, because we're 100 years old and we want to celebrate big."

The tournament was announced by CONMEBOL on 24 October 2012 and confirmed by CONCACAF on 1 May 2014.

On 26 September 2014, FIFA announced that the tournament had been added to the FIFA International Match Calendar, meaning that clubs had to release players called up to the competition.

The tournament occurred in June 2016, along with UEFA Euro 2016.

Sports executive corruption

The tournament was placed in doubt after several high-profile sports executive arrests were made including people involved with media rights holder Datisa (using the trading name of "Wematch"), a partnership between three media rights companies; Full Play, Torneos and Traffic Sports Marketing. In December 2014, Brazilian José Hawilla, the owner and founder of Traffic Sports pled guilty to "corruption charges including racketeering, wire fraud and money laundering". In an indictment, the FBI stated that officials were to receive bribes totalling US$20million for the 2016 event. Datisa held agreements for the commercial rights with CONMEBOL and CONCACAF and had their bank account frozen placing the tournament in jeopardy. On 21 October 2015 CONCACAF announced that they had terminated their agreement with Datisa.

On 23 October 2015, CONCACAF, CONMEBOL and the hosting association US Soccer Federation all confirmed that the tournament was going ahead as originally intended.

Trophy

A new trophy was supposed to be created for the tournament and was to be unveiled on 4 July 2015 at the 2015 Copa América final. No trophy was unveiled amidst the FIFA corruption scandal.
However, CONMEBOL announced that, on 28 April 2016, a presentation for the trophy would take place in Bogotá, Colombia.

On 28 April 2016, it was explained on the Copa América website that the "new" trophy was in fact commemorative, and would only be given to the winning country to keep, while the original silver trophy would continue to be awarded to each winner of the tournament (including the 2016 winner). The Centenario trophy retains the silhouette of the original trophy's Grecian urn, but is plated in matte gold. The front of the trophy is adorned with a raised (and in the case of some parts of the logo, engraved) image of the Copa América Centenario wordmark and logo. On each side are raised and polished images of a connected North and South America, commemorating the first Copa América held outside South America. Instead of the traditional wooden base holding the names of all past winners, the base of the Centenario commemorative trophy includes 16 zones, in which the names of all 16 nations are engraved. Other details include: The logos of both CONMEBOL and CONCACAF (the two confederations with representatives in the tournament), the years "1916–2016" (commemorating the 100 years of CONMEBOL and Copa América), and the phrases "La Copa del Siglo" ("The Cup of the Century") and "Uniting the Americas".

Host selection
Luis Chiriboga, the President of the Ecuadorian Football Federation stated the United States and Mexico were potential hosts of at least one stage of the competition.
Hawit preferred the competition to be hosted in the United States for financial reasons, stating that "the market is in the United States, the stadiums are in the United States, the people are in the United States. The study that we have made [shows] that everything’s in the United States." In July 2012, CONCACAF President Jeffrey Webb stated there was much organizing to be done.

On 1 May 2014, it was announced that the tournament would be held in the United States from 3–26 June 2016.

The decision to select the US as a host was the object of criticism by Uruguay Football Association president Wilmar Valdez on 7 June 2016, who complained that the US is "a country where they don't feel football", which "brings about problems." The complaint was voiced after Uruguay's defeat against Mexico, in favor of whom, he said, the event was biased. Just prior to the game itself, the Chilean anthem was mistakenly played instead of the Uruguayan anthem.

Venues
On 8 January 2015, CONCACAF and CONMEBOL announced the 24 U.S. metropolitan areas which had indicated interest in hosting matches.

The stadiums were chosen following a bidding process, with the minimum capacity to be 50,000. The final list of venues, anticipated to number between 8 and 13, was to be announced in May 2015. However, the list was not released and speculation regarding whether the tournament will be able to move forward arose because Interpol red notices were issued for the former presidents of the CONMEBOL and CONCACAF confederations in relation to the 2015 FIFA corruption case, including allegations that they accepted significant bribes in relation to the $112.5 million broadcasting deal for the event. However, officials from CONMEBOL expressed a desire to move forward with the event despite the scandal.

On 19 November 2015, the ten venues selected for the tournament were announced by CONCACAF, CONMEBOL, and US Soccer Federation.

Participating teams
At the official announcement of the tournament, CONMEBOL and CONCACAF confirmed that all ten CONMEBOL members would be joined by six CONCACAF teams in the tournament. United States and Mexico automatically qualified. The other four spots were given to Costa Rica, the champions of the Central American Football Union by virtue of winning the 2014 Copa Centroamericana, Jamaica, the champions of the Caribbean Football Union by virtue of winning the 2014 Caribbean Cup, and Haiti and Panama, the two play-off winners among the four highest finishers in the 2015 CONCACAF Gold Cup not already qualified.

Draw

The group seeds and match schedule were announced on 17 December 2015. The United States (Group A) were seeded as host, while Argentina (Group D) were seeded as the highest FIFA-ranked team in the CONMEBOL region during December 2015. According to Soccer United Marketing, Brazil (Group B) and Mexico (Group C) were seeded as they were "the most decorated nations in the last 100 years in international competitions from their respective confederations". However, there was criticism for not including Uruguay, which won two World Cups and was the Copa América all-time leader with 15 championships, or Chile, which were the defending Copa América champions going into the tournament.

The draw took place on 21 February 2016 at 19:30 EST, at the Hammerstein Ballroom in New York City. Teams were seeded using the FIFA Ranking from December 2015.

The four group pots contained four positions each, one from each group, as follows:

Squads

Each country had a final squad of 23 players (three of whom had to be goalkeepers) which had to be submitted before the deadline of 20 May 2016.

Match officials

Opening ceremony
The opening ceremony of Copa América Centenario took place at Levi's Stadium in Santa Clara 21:00 EDT (UTC−4) on 3 June 2016 ahead of the opening match and featured musical performances by Colombian singer J Balvin, American singer Jason Derulo and the Canadian band Magic!

Group stage

All times are EDT (UTC−4). The top two teams from each group advanced to the quarter-finals.

Tiebreakers
The ranking of each team in each group was determined as follows:
Greatest number of points obtained in all group matches
Goal difference in all group matches
Greatest number of goals scored in all group matches
If two or more teams were equal on the basis of the above three criteria, their rankings would further be determined as follows:
Greatest number of points obtained in the group matches between the teams concerned
Goal difference resulting from the group matches between the teams concerned
Greater number of goals scored in all group matches between the teams concerned
Drawing of lots

Group A

Group B

Group C

Group D

Knockout stage

In the quarter-finals, semi-finals, and third place match of the knockout stage, a penalty shoot-out was used to decide the winner if tied after 90 minutes. In the final, extra time and a penalty shoot-out was used to decide the winner if necessary. Should the final enter extra time, a fourth substitute would be allowed as part of FIFA's approval of rule changes based on IFAB's new regulations, however neither teams in the final ended up taking advantage of this rule.

Bracket

Quarter-finals

Semi-finals

Third place play-off

Final

Statistics

Goalscorers
Chile's Eduardo Vargas received the Golden Boot award for scoring six goals. In total, 91 goals were scored by 62 different players, with three of them credited as own goals.

6 goals

 Eduardo Vargas

5 goals

 Lionel Messi

4 goals

 Gonzalo Higuaín

3 goals

 Philippe Coutinho
 Alexis Sánchez
 Clint Dempsey

2 goals

 Ezequiel Lavezzi
 Erik Lamela
 Renato Augusto
 José Pedro Fuenzalida
 Edson Puch
 Arturo Vidal
 Carlos Bacca
 James Rodríguez
 Enner Valencia
 Blas Pérez
 Salomón Rondón

1 goal

 Sergio Agüero
 Éver Banega
 Víctor Cuesta
 Ángel Di María
 Nicolás Otamendi
 Juan Carlos Arce
 Jhasmani Campos
 Gabriel Barbosa
 Lucas Lima
 Charles Aránguiz
 Frank Fabra
 Marlos Moreno
 Cristián Zapata
 Celso Borges
 Johan Venegas
 Michael Arroyo
 Jaime Ayoví
 Miller Bolaños
 Christian Noboa
 Antonio Valencia
 James Marcelin
 Jesús Manuel Corona
 Javier Hernández
 Héctor Herrera
 Rafael Márquez
 Oribe Peralta
 Abdiel Arroyo
 Miguel Camargo
 Víctor Ayala
 Christian Cueva
 Edison Flores
 Paolo Guerrero
 Raúl Ruidíaz
 Jermaine Jones
 Bobby Wood
 Gyasi Zardes
 Graham Zusi
 Mathías Corujo
 Diego Godín
 Abel Hernández
 Josef Martínez
 José Manuel Velázquez

1 own goal
 Frank Fabra (against Costa Rica)
 Je-Vaughn Watson (against Uruguay)
 Álvaro Pereira (against Mexico)

Awards

Winners

Individual awards
The following awards were given at the conclusion of the tournament.
 Golden Ball Award:  Alexis Sánchez
 Golden Boot Award:  Eduardo Vargas (6 goals)
 Golden Glove Award:  Claudio Bravo
 Fair Play Award:

Final Man of the Match Award 
  Claudio Bravo

Team of the Tournament
The Technical Study Group announced the tournament's Best XI squad.

Marketing

Sponsorship

Match ball
The Nike Ordem Ciento was announced as the official Copa América Centenario match ball on 21 February 2016. The mainly white ball has red brush stroke decoration. It shows the official Copa América Centenario logo.

The Nike Ordem Campeón was used for the final match, in which golden brushes replaced the red ones.

Theme songs
"Superstar" by American rapper Pitbull featuring Becky G is the official song of the tournament and both artists performed the song during the Final.
"Breaking All the Rules" by English rock musician Peter Frampton, who performed the song during the Final.
"In My City" by Indian Singer Priyanka Chopra, who also performed the song during the Final.

Broadcasting rights

CONMEBOL and CONCACAF

Rest of the world

Controversies

National anthems, country names, and flags
On 5 June, during the pre-match ceremony between Mexico and Uruguay, the national anthem of Chile was played for Uruguay. Many Uruguayan players seemed confused. The correct anthem was never played. Copa América organizers released the following statement via Twitter:This evening during the pre-match ceremony, due to human error, we inadvertently played the incorrect National Anthem [sic]. We sincerely apologize to the Uruguayan Federation, the Uruguay National Team, the people of Uruguay and to the fans for this mistake. We will work with all parties involved to ensure such an error this does not occur again.

Uruguayan midfielder Diego Fagúndez said the incident showed "much disrespect".

On 6 June, Colombian nationals heavily criticized Adidas for misspelling the country name in an advertisement, substituting "Columbia" for "Colombia". The company said in a statement: "We value our partnership with the Colombian Football Federation and apologize for our mistake. We removed the graphics and are quickly installing new versions."

Also on 6 June, before the game between Panama and Bolivia, the video screens of the Citrus Bowl in Orlando displayed the flags of both countries, but Bolivia's was inverted.

Match officiating

On 4 June, during the game between Ecuador and Brazil, the assistant referee called the ball out prior to a cross that led to the ball going into the net for Ecuador. Brazilian goalkeeper Alisson dropped the ball, and it went over the line into his own goal. The replays seemed to show the ball was not completely out of bounds before being crossed, but the goal did not stand. The match ended in a 0–0 draw.

On 10 June, during the game between Chile and Bolivia, a penalty kick was awarded to Chile after Luis Alberto Gutiérrez was whistled for a handball. The assistant referee made the call, but it appeared that Gutiérrez had tucked his arm behind his back, and the ball hit off his shoulder. Arturo Vidal converted the ensuing penalty at the 90'+10' mark (eight minutes of stoppage time were added to the second half due to an injury to Ronald Eguino) to secure the three points for Chile.

On 12 June, during the game between Peru and Brazil, Raúl Ruidíaz scored by guiding the ball into the net with his arm. After a lengthy discussion between the referee and his assistant, the goal was allowed to stand, and Brazil went on to lose 1–0, resulting in their elimination from the tournament. However, Raúl Ruidíaz claimed the ball hit his thigh rather than his hand and said the goal was 'thanks to God' rather than another hand of God.

Ticket pricing

The tournament's organizers have been criticized for setting high ticket prices that have resulted in under-capacity crowds in Seattle and Chicago for United States matches. The average price for a sold ticket during the group stage was $144; some matches saw average prices as high as $236 and as low as $37.

See also
 Soccer in the United States
 Football at the Pan American Games

References

External links

 Official website (archived, 28 November 2016)
 Copa América Centenario at CONMEBOL
 Copa América Centenario at CONCACAF
 Copa América Centenario at US Soccer

 
CONCACAF competitions
CONMEBOL competitions
2016
International association football competitions hosted by the United States
2016 in South American football
2015–16 in CONCACAF football
2016 in American soccer
June 2016 sports events in the United States
Centennial anniversaries